The 1963 Gator Bowl was a college football postseason bowl game that featured the Air Force Falcons and the North Carolina Tar Heels.

Background
This was the Falcons' first bowl game since 1959. The Tar Heels were co-champions of the Atlantic Coast Conference, which was their first conference title since the 1949 Southern Conference title. This was their first bowl game in 1950.

Game summary
UNC – Willard 1 run (Kick failed), 2:34 remaining
UNC – Edge 6 run (Pass failed), 9:40 remaining
UNC – Robinson 5 pass from Black (Robinson pass from Black), 4:29 remaining
UNC – Kessler 1 run (Lacey pass from Edge), 4:44 remaining
UNC – Black 5 run (Chapman kick), 13:19 remaining

Willard ran for 94 yards on 18 carries.

Aftermath
Air Force did not return to a bowl game until 1971, nor win one until 1982. North Carolina did not return to a bowl game until 1970.

The morning after the game, there was a fire at the Hotel Roosevelt in downtown Jacksonville, with 22 dying.

Statistics

References

Further reading
 

Gator Bowl
Gator Bowl
Air Force Falcons football bowl games
North Carolina Tar Heels football bowl games
December 1963 sports events in the United States
Gator Bowl